Roštiljijada or Leskovac Roštiljijada ( / ; also  / ) is a yearly grilled meat barbecue-based festival organised at the beginning of September in Leskovac, Serbia. During the event, the main boulevard is closed for traffic, night and day for five days, and all its way there are grill-stands constructed, to create many temporary restaurants. Many visitors from all over Serbia and many tourists from abroad come to Leskovac to enjoy a grill and entertainment. The organisers hold competitions, such as in making the world biggest Pljeskavica.  The festival is the highlight of the season in Leskovac.

To attract tourists from Serbia and abroad, the tourist organization organizes every year attractive concerts, fashion shows, carnivals, Miss Election during the period of Roštiljijada festival. So far a lot has been done by raising quality, organizing a festival modeled on the Oktoberfest in Munich, such as a media presentations and good marketing which resulted in a very successful festival. According to the City Tourist Board, the number of visitors is one of the top touristic events in Serbia. In 2013, a record number of 600,000 people visited the festival.  More than 200 barbecues were operational.

In addition to guests from Serbia, many visitors from abroad visit festival as well mostly from Slovenia, Bulgaria, North Macedonia, Greece, Hungary, Romania and France.

World records

In September 2016, Leskovac celebrated a world record in making the world's biggest Pljeskavica.

International carnival

In 2009, Leskovac officially became an International carnival city, admitted by The Association of European Carnival Cities, which has over 50 members from Europe and America. The Leskovac carnival is held in a time of the Roštiljijada festival. Around 1,200 people take part in the carnival, of which one third come from abroad. The city government considered having a separation of this event in 2010, as a special tourist event which is going to be introduced as a special offer of the city.

References

External links

About, at the official website 
Roštiljijada/Roštiljada at the City of Leskovac website 
Tourist Festivities at the City of Leskovac website
Roštiljijada at the Leskovac tourist board website

Barbecue
Food and drink festivals in Serbia
Hamburgers (food)
Leskovac
Serbian cuisine
Annual events in Serbia
Meat festivals
Autumn events in Serbia